American Girl is an American line of  dolls released on May 5, 1986, by Pleasant Company. The dolls portray eight- to fourteen-year-old boys and girls of various ethnicities, faiths, and social classes from different time periods throughout history. They are sold with accompanying books told from the viewpoint of the girls. Originally the stories focused on various periods of American history, but were expanded to include characters and stories from contemporary life. Aside from the original American Girl dolls, buyers also have the option to purchase dolls that look like themselves. The options for the line of Truly Me dolls include eye color, face mold, skin color, hair texture, and hair length. A variety of related clothing and accessories is also available. A service for ordering a custom-made doll with features and clothing specified by the owner dubbed Create Your Own, has also been introduced in 2017.

Pleasant Company was founded in 1986 by Pleasant Rowland in Middleton, Wisconsin, and its products were originally purchasable by mail order only. In 1998, Pleasant Company became a subsidiary of Mattel after Mattel purchased the company for $700 million. The company has been awarded the Oppenheim Toy Portfolio Award eight times, and was inducted in the National Toy Hall of Fame in 2021.

Dolls and accessories

The Historical Characters line of 18-inch dolls, which were derived from the 18-inch dolls made by Götz in West Germany (known as Germany from October 1990) during the late 1980s to the 1990s, were initially the main focus of Pleasant Company, founded by Pleasant Rowland in 1986. This product line aims to teach aspects of American history through a six-book series from the perspective of a girl living in that time period. Pleasant Rowland came up with the idea after she returned from a trip to Colonial Williamsburg, where she noticed there was a significant void in the toy market for younger-aged dolls and saw an opportunity to provide an alternative to baby and adult dolls. Although the books are written for girls who are at least eight years old, they endeavor to cover significant topics such as child labor, child abuse, poverty, racism, slavery, animal abuse and war in appropriate manners for the understanding and sensibilities of their young audiences.

In 1994, Pleasant Company released a line of contemporary dolls called American Girl of Today. In 2006, the product line was renamed Just Like You; it was changed again in 2010 to My American Girl, and in 2015 to Truly Me. This line has included ninety-two different dolls over the years. Each doll has a different combination of face mold, skin tone, eye color, hair color, length, texture, and/or style. American Girl states that this variety allows customers to choose dolls that "represent the individuality and diversity of today's American girls." A wide variety of contemporary clothing, accessories, and furniture is also available, and there are regular releases and retirements to update this line. Each year, a Girl of the Year doll is released who has her own unique talent; for example, Mia St. Clair, the Girl of the Year for 2008, was an ice skater, and Marisol Luna, the Girl of the Year for 2005, was a dancer.

Girls of Many Lands was released by American Girl in the holiday season of 2002. Each doll was 9 inches tall and represented a 12-year-old girl from a time in history; in addition, each doll came with an accompanying book. Along with specific ethnicities, the dolls were given a home country and time periods, such as 1592 England, 1711 France, 1846 Ethiopia, and more. Sculpted by Helen Kish, the dolls were meant for display only and were priced from $48 to $54. The doll line lasted until the Fall of 2005.

Bitty Baby is a line of 15" baby dolls targeted to children aged three and older. They are cheaper than the 18" dolls and currently retail at $60 each. In 2013, American Girl Publishing released Bitty Baby books, picture books aimed at girls ages 3-6.

The Bitty Twins line debuted in 2003 to represent slightly older toddlers and/or preschoolers. The Bitty Twins were the same size as the Bitty Baby dolls. They were discontinued in June 2016.

Hopscotch Hill School was released by American Girl in 2003. They, along with the stories which came with the dolls written by Valerie Tripp, were aimed at elementary-age girls from four to six years old and were sold until 2006.

A reboot of the Historical Characters line dubbed as BeForever was launched in August 2014, complete with redesigned outfits, a two-volume compilation of previously released books, and a "Journey Book" for each character, with players taking the role of a present-day girl who found her way to the past and met up with one of the Historical girls. The line also coincided with the relaunch of Samantha Parkington, whose collection was discontinued in 2008.

In June 2016, American Girl unveiled Wellie Wishers, a separate doll line similar to Hopscotch Hill School aimed at younger children and with a focus on nature and the outdoors, positioning it between Bitty Baby and the BeForever/Girl of the Year/Truly Me dolls. As the name implies, dolls from the line wear Wellington (wellie) boots and have a body design distinct from the classic, Götz-derived American Girl dolls. The line was released on June 23, 2016. The names of the Wellie Wishers are: Willa, Camille, Kendall, Emerson, Ashlyn, and Bryant.

In February 2017, American Girl released a new line of 18" dolls called contemporary characters. The first doll in the line was Tenney Grant, a young aspiring country singer, and songwriter. Other dolls of the modern line include Logan, Tenney's bandmate and American Girl's first-ever boy doll, and Z Yang, who is interested in photography and making stop motion videos.

In December 2019, there was a published report indicating declining sales for The American Girl Doll Brand. Following four years of declining sales at Mattel, American Girls sales rose 13% in the fourth quarter of 2020.

Following Mattel's commitment to diversity, growing calls from consumers to include more racial diversity in the brand, and the 2020 racial justice protests in the United States, American Girl released a brand new line of 18" dolls called World by Us. The dolls and their books promote messages of various social justice issues that are age-appropriate for the line's target audience and cover relevant subjects such as racism, immigration, and climate change. The line debuted in September 2021 with three dolls: Makena Williams, Maritza Ochoa, and Evette Peeters. The line also features doll outfits designed by Harlem's Fashion Row fashion designers.

Characters

Films

In 2004, American Girl teamed up with Julia Roberts' Red Om production company and to create the first American Girl direct-to-video movie, Samantha: An American Girl Holiday. The film spawned a franchise that was followed by Felicity: An American Girl Adventure (2005), Molly: An American Girl on the Home Front (2006), along with the 2008 theatrically released film Kit Kittredge: An American Girl, starring Abigail Breslin. In 2009, HBO premiered An American Girl: Chrissa Stands Strong. In July 2012, American Girl released a direct-to-video movie, McKenna Shoots for the Stars. A seventh movie based on Saige Copeland's stories entitled Saige Paints the Sky was released in July 2013, and a television film, Isabelle Dances Into the Spotlight, based on Girl of the Year 2014, Isabelle Palmer, was released in 2014. A ninth film based on 2015 Girl of the Year, Grace Thomas, was released under the title An American Girl: Grace Stirs Up Success, with Olivia Rodrigo playing the title role. The tenth film, Lea To The Rescue, was released on June 14, 2016, with Maggie Elizabeth Jones playing Lea Clark.

A live-action web special based on Melody Ellison's stories entitled An American Girl Story - Melody 1963: Love Has to Win was released by Amazon, starring Marsai Martin as the title character. Love Has to Win was then followed by An American Girl Story - Maryellen 1955: Extraordinary Christmas, starring Alyvia Alyn Lind as Maryellen Larkin and released by Amazon Prime Video on November 25, 2016. Another film entitled An American Girl Story - Ivy & Julie 1976: A Happy Balance, starring Nina Lu as Ivy Ling and Hannah Nordberg as Julie Albright, was released by Amazon on March 24, 2017.

In February 2019, Mattel Films and MGM announced the development of a live-action children's movie based on the doll line.

American Girl Store

The American Girl store sells American Girl dolls, clothes, and accessories. The first store, the 35,000 square-foot American Girl Place, designed by Nancye Green of Donovan/Green, debuted in Chicago, Illinois, in 1998. The original American Girl Place on Chicago Avenue also had a restaurant and 150-seat theater. It was followed by stores in New York City and Los Angeles.

In May 2014, Mattel American Girl opened several new stores in Toronto, Ontario and Vancouver, British Columbia in Canada in partnership with Indigo Books and Music. The company has also expressed interest in possibly exploring other overseas ventures, as they are seeing orders reach Europe and Latin America. In 2015, the company announced that they were expanding operations in Mexico with two stores at El Palacio de Hierro’s Perisur and Interlomas in Mexico City, and a third in Polanco. In July 2022, the company had 12 retails stores.

Magazine
The American Girl magazine was run by the American Girl company. It was started by the Pleasant Company in Middleton, Wisconsin in 1992, with the first issue dated November/December 1992. Aimed towards girls ages 8–14, the bimonthly magazine included articles, recipes, advice columns, fiction, arts and crafts, and activity ideas. American Girl announced in late 2018 that the January/February 2019 issue would be the magazine's last.

Online marketing and philanthropy
American Girl launched Innerstar University, an online virtual world featuring the My American Girl contemporary doll line, on July 13, 2010. Access to the online world is via a Campus Guide, bundled with the purchase of a My American Girl doll, which contains an access code for the creation of a doll avatar that then navigates to various games, shops, and challenges offered on the virtual campus of Innerstar U. In 2015, when My American Girl dolls were changed to Truly Me dolls, this website was closed down. The launch was simultaneous with Shine on Now, a fund-raising effort for Kids In Distressed Situations, National Association of Children's Hospitals and Related Institutions, National Wildlife Federation, and Save the Children charities. The company has also donated "almost $500,000" over several years to national non-profit homeless housing group HomeAid. These contributions are mainly through its Project Playhouse program.

Reception
The company has drawn criticism for the expense of the dolls, which cost $115 without accessories as of December 2014. Buyers can easily spend more than $600 for a doll, outfits, accessories, and lunch in the company's store in New York.
Some aspects of the doll's characters and history have also provoked controversy. Some observers questioned why Addy, American Girl's first African-American historical character released in 1993, was portrayed first as a slave (in later stories Addy and her family gain their freedom after the Civil War), while Cecile Rey, American Girl's second black historical character, was portrayed as a well-to-do black girl in New Orleans. American Girl later went on with releasing their first African-American Girl of the Year, Gabriela McBride, who is portrayed as a dancer, artist, and poet.  In 2005, residents of Pilsen (a neighborhood in Chicago, Illinois) criticized a passage in the book associated with the Latina-American doll Marisol, claiming it inaccurately depicted their neighborhood as dangerous. A senior public relations associate for American Girl responded to critics saying: “We feel that this brief passage has been taken out of context in the book." The 2009 limited-edition release of Gwen, an American Girl character experiencing homelessness, was also deemed as controversial.

In 2005, some anti-abortion and Catholic groups criticized the company for donating funds to the organization Girls, Inc., which supports underprivileged girls and promotes abortion rights, access to reproductive healthcare, and LGBTQ+ acceptance.

The American Girl Place store in New York City was the center of a labor dispute with Actors' Equity Association (AEA). On August 3, 2006, 14 of the 18 adult actors at the store's now defunct theater went on strike together.  AEA reached a two-year contract effective April 1, 2008. All American Girl Place theatres were subsequently closed in September of that year.

In May 2014, the company was met with criticism on social media over its decision to discontinue four characters from the historical collection, two of them, namely African-American Cécile Rey and Chinese-American Ivy Ling, who represented young women belonging to ethnic minorities. They, however, defended their move as a business decision, as they decided to "move away from the character-friend strategy within the line". A petition has since been filed through the activist group 18MillionRising.org for the company to provide a replacement for Ivy. The company has also drawn criticism for its recent focus on the contemporary line, specifically the Girl of the Year characters and their backstory, to which was viewed as lacking depth and more critical issues in comparison to the Historical/BeForever characters' backstories. My Little Pony: Friendship Is Magic series creator Lauren Faust also expressed her concern and criticism of the line in a Twitter post, stating it "was once radically positive for girls before it was homogenized for money".

In July 2020, an internet meme in the form of a parody advertisement for a fictional Girl of the Year character depicted as a personification of the "Karen" stereotype, wearing a track suit, bob haircut, and openly carrying a semi-automatic pistol while defiantly violating face mask guidelines mandated by the government due to the COVID-19 pandemic, provoked criticism from American Girl who took umbrage to the use of their name and trade dress, stating that they were "disgusted" by a post from brand strategist Adam Padilla under the online persona "Adam the Creator", and "are working with the appropriate teams at American Girl to ensure this copyright violation is handled appropriately." Boing Boing however expressed doubts over the merits of American Girl's proposed legal action against the "Karen" parodies citing the Streisand effect, though it has also noted the debate on whether the satirical intent of the parody advertisement is protected by law.

Representation of Native Americans
Kaya'aton'my, a Nez Perce character whose story takes place in 1764, and Josefina, a Latina girl from New Mexico in 1824, are both set before colonization and have been criticized for avoiding the issue of genocide through these pre-Western contact settings. With the most noticeably native marketed doll Kaya'aton'my, being the chronologically oldest character out of all the Historical line's timelines, as her story began in 1764, and by making her the oldest doll in the line, American Girl has been accused of contributing to the myth that native people only existed in the past, consequently ignoring and discreditng modern day natives. Setting Kaya'aton'my in the past also perpetuates the “memory of the Indian” as a fixture of the past and is necessary to the American manifest destiny belief that originally resulted in the genocide of native people across North America. Nanea's story being set in a colonized Hawaii in 1941, could have fixed this aspect of the avoidance of genocide and colonization, but her story fails to mention either of these aspects and depicts Hawaiians as happy to be a part of the United States as per United States military pamphlets portray of the same time period.

A primary critique of the doll line concerning their native characters is that the dolls themselves are inaccessible to the communities they are intended to represent. This issue has been discussed before as the dolls have a price tag of over 100 dollars USD and are consequently not accessible to the average American family, which is the intended audience for the doll brand. This issue of lack of accessibility is compounded by the high price tag and limited locations available to purchase these dolls, as American Girl has only a few outlet stores across the continental United States and is not accessible to many native people who live on reservations.

Another issue critics have brought up with the American Girl's native representation is that it is coming from a majority non-native company. Although American Girl has a page on their website dedicated to inclusion from voices of black women authors and creators, many other voices are missing from marginalized groups, including native ones. 

American Girl worked with a Nez Perce advisory board in creating Kaya, and according to senior designer manager Heather Northrop Kaya's face sculpt was crafted specifically for her according to the Nimiipuu's people's beliefs that baring teeth is considered to be aggressive.

Nanea was based on a real native Hawaiian woman's experience with the bombing of Pearl Harbor, Dorinda Makanaonalani Nicholson. American Girl contacted Nicholson after reading her book Pearl Harbor Child: A Child's View of Pearl Harbor from Attack to Peace, and invited her to attend their advisory panel to help develop the details of Nanea's story. Nanea's character is Hawaiian on her mother's side and European on her father's side, so American Girl consulted with Dorinda Makanaonalani Nicholson, a woman with the same heritage, as part of an effort to share more inclusive perspectives and authentic stories with their audience.

Permanent underwear controversy
American Girl attracted considerable criticism in February 2017 when they announced that they were changing the dolls' bodies to incorporate permanently stitched panties on contemporary dolls and certain BeForever character dolls, namely Maryellen, Melody and Julie. Public reaction to the permanent underwear—the first major change since the transition to flesh-colored bodies in 1991 following the release of the Felicity doll—was overwhelmingly negative, as fans of the franchise complained that it stifles customization and devalued a well-established and successful brand "from heirloom quality to be passed down for generations to low-quality retail."

The company then reversed its decision in a Facebook post in May 2017, stating that any existing or upcoming dolls from the line will revert to the old body design, and customers who bought a doll with permanent underwear are eligible for a "one-time" exchange to have the dolls retrofitted with conventional torsos. In addition, the company has switched back to the old "iconic boutique box" packaging after complaints by collectors who deemed the new boxes to be inferior and more susceptible to damage.

Fandom
YouTube videos made with American Girl Dolls are becoming increasingly popular. In 2015, the American Girl fan community, more specifically the practice of creating and uploading American Girl doll-based stop motion videos (AGSM for short), was featured in a news report for BBC News' Trending site, along with interviews and videos from several prominent doll community members. Besides stop-motion animations and music videos set to popular music, the report covers recurring subject matters in said clips, such as cyberbullying and other social issues among children and teenagers, along with doll customization, photoshoots and unboxing videos showing new and discontinued clothing, accessories, and dolls from the company.

Besides YouTube, social media services, such as Instagram and Facebook, serve as platforms for fans of the toy line, spawning a community called AGIG, or American Girl Instagram, who photograph their dolls and post their photos on the service. Although mostly made up of girls, usually around the age of 12–18, several young boys and adults also participate and congregate on AGIG.

American Girl's teenage fans, particularly ones on AGTube and AGIG, will organize meetups with other fans at American Girl stores. At the release of Lea Clark and Gabriela McBride, certain prominent community members were included in the "Clue" videos released by American Girl. At the release of Z Yang, American Girl hosted meetups at their New York City flagship store and Dallas location.

In 2019, the American Girls Podcast, a book-by-book exploration of the series, was launched. Co-hosted by historians Allison Horrocks and Mary Mahoney, each episode discusses one book from the series, contextualizing the story presented and making connections to elements of relevant pop culture. The podcast has received positive attention from many media outlets, including The New York Times.

In May 2022, the American Girl Podcast Network was launched. The three original shows are aimed to capture a multi-generational fanbase, based on American Girl's advice book series, A Smart Girl's Guide.

See also

 A Girl for All Time
 Journey Girls

Notes

References

External links
 Official American Girl website
 "A Message to All American Girls" - From Pleasant Rowland, on the thirtieth anniversary of the founding of American Girls.

 
1980s toys
1986 establishments in Wisconsin
1990s toys
2000s toys
2010s toys
2020s toys
American companies established in 1986
Children's magazines published in the United States
Defunct magazines published in the United States
Doll brands
Doll manufacturing companies
Educational toys
Fashion dolls
Magazines disestablished in 2019
Magazines established in 1992
Magazines published in Wisconsin
Mass media in Madison, Wisconsin
Mattel
Native American-related controversies
Products introduced in 1986
Toy companies established in 1986
Toy controversies